Starfinder may refer to:
Starfinder (game show), a British television show
Starfinder Roleplaying Game, a science-fiction role-playing game by Paizo Publishing